Paz Castillo is one of the 21 municipalities (municipios) that makes up the Venezuelan state of Miranda, named after poet and diplomat Fernando Paz Castillo and, according to a 2007 population estimate by the National Institute of Statistics of Venezuela, the municipality has a population of 111,335.  The town of Santa Lucía is the municipal seat of the Paz Castillo Municipality.

Demographics
The Paz Castillo Municipality, according to a 2007 population estimate by the National Institute of Statistics of Venezuela, has a population of 111,335 (up from 90,778 in 2000). This amounts to 3.9% of the state's population.

Government
The mayor of the Paz Castillo Municipality is Elio Serrano, re-elected on October 31, 2004, with 57% of the vote.  The municipality is divided into one parishes; (Santa Lucía).

References

Municipalities of Miranda (state)